John Russell may refer to:

Arts and entertainment
 John Russell (English painter) (1745–1806), English painter
 John Russell (Australian painter) (1858–1930), Australian painter
 John Russell (screenwriter) (1885–1956), author and screenwriter
 John L. Russell (cinematographer) (1905–1967), American cinematographer
 Johnny Russell (saxophonist) (1909–1991), American jazz saxophonist
 John Russell (art critic) (1919–2008), British American art critic
 John Russell (actor) (1921–1991), American actor in the TV series Lawman
 Johnny Russell (singer) (1940–2001), American country singer
 John Russell (musician) (1954–2021), acoustic guitarist
 John Morris Russell (born 1960), American conductor
 John C. Russell (1963–1994), playwright
 John Russell of Bluffdale, American novelist, writer and Baptist preacher
 John Wentworth Russell, Canadian painter
 Johnnie Russell (born 1933), stage name of John R. Countryman, American diplomat and former child actor

Military
 John Russell (Royalist) (1620–1687), English MP and soldier
 John Henry Russell (1827–1897), officer of the United States Navy
 John Russell (Medal of Honor) (1852–?), United States Navy sailor and recipient of the Medal of Honor
 John H. Russell Jr. (1872–1947), major general and 16th Commandant of the Marine Corps
 John Tinsley Russell (1904–1942), New Zealand soldier
 John Russell (VC) (1893–1917), British Army officer who was awarded the Victoria Cross 
 John Russell (aviator) (1894–1960), flying ace
 John Russell, 3rd Baron Ampthill (1896–1973), British peer and Royal Navy officer
 John M. Russell, U.S. Army sergeant, perpetrator of the Camp Liberty killings (2009)

Politics

United States
 John Russell (New York politician) (1772–1842), United States Representative from New York
 John Russell (prohibitionist) (1822–1912), first National Committee Chairman of the Prohibition Party
 John Russell (Ohio politician) (1827–1869), Ohio Secretary of State, 1868–1869
 John Russell (Virginia politician) (1923-2012), American politician
 John E. Russell (1834–1903), U.S. Representative from Massachusetts
 John W. Russell Jr. (1923–2015), member of the Oklahoma House of Representatives from 1947 to 1951 and the Oklahoma Senate between 1952 and 1956
 John Russell (Missouri politician) (born 1931), Missouri state senator

United Kingdom

 Sir John Russell (knight) (died 1224), English household knight of King John
 Sir John Russell (died 1270), Anglo-Scottish noble
 John Russell (MP for Coventry), MP for Coventry in 1302
 John Russell (died 1405) (1350s–1405), MP for Worcestershire
 John Russell (fl. 1410), MP for Wells
 John Russell (speaker) (died 1437), MP for Herefordshire and Speaker of the House of Commons
 John Russell, 1st Earl of Bedford (1485–1555), English royal minister
 John Russell (Westminster MP), MP for Westminster, London, 1545–1547
 Sir John Russell, 3rd Baronet (1632?–1669), of Chippenham
 John Russell (Royalist) (died 1687), English MP and soldier
 John Russell (colonial administrator) (1670–1735), administrator of the English East India Company
 John Russell, 4th Duke of Bedford (1710–1771), British statesman
 John Russell, 6th Duke of Bedford (1766–1839), Knight of the Garter
 John Russell, 1st Earl Russell (1792–1878), known as Lord John Russell before 1861, British prime minister
 John Russell, Viscount Amberley (1842–1876), progressive Liberal MP
 John Russell (diplomat) (1914–1984), British diplomat and ambassador
 John Russell, 13th Duke of Bedford (1917–2002), British peer and writer
 John Russell, 4th Earl Russell (1921–1987), eldest son of Bertrand Russell
 John Russell, 27th Baron de Clifford (1928–2018), Peer of England
 John Russell, 7th Earl Russell (born 1971), English politician

Elsewhere
 John Watts-Russell (1825–1875), New Zealand politician

Religion
 John Russell (bishop) (died 1494), bishop of Lincoln and Lord High Chancellor of England, 1483–1485
 John Russell (clergyman) (1626–1692), Puritan minister
 John Russell (headmaster) (1787–1863), English clergyman and headmaster of Charterhouse School
 John Russell (parson) (1795–1883), hunter, dog breeder, and cleric
 John Lewis Russell (1808–1854), American botanist and Unitarian minister
 John Fuller Russell (1814–1888), Church of England priest, writer, and art collector
 John Russell (priest, born 1868) (1868–1949), Archdeacon of Oamaru / North Otago in New Zealand
 John Russell (priest, born 1792) (1792–1865), Archdeacon of Clogher, Ireland
 John Joyce Russell (1897–1993), American prelate of the Roman Catholic Church

Sports

Association football
 John Russell (footballer, born 1872) (1872–1905), Scottish footballer
 John Russell (Cambuslang footballer) (fl. 1890), Scottish footballer for Cambuslang and the national team
 John Russell (Dumbarton footballer) (fl. 1922–1928), Scottish footballer for Airdrie and Dumbarton
 John Russell (footballer, born 1923) (1923–2005), Scottish footballer (Motherwell FC, Kilmarnock FC)
 John Russell (Queen's Park footballer) (fl. 1924–1933), Scottish footballer
 John Russell (Irish footballer) (born 1985), Irish footballer for Sligo Rovers FC
 Johnny Russell (footballer) (born 1990), Scottish footballer (Dundee United, Derby County, Sporting KC, national team)
 Jon Russell (footballer) (born 2000), English footballer for Huddersfield Town, Chelsea and Accrington Stanley

Baseball
 John Russell (pitcher) (1895–1930), for the Brooklyn Robins and Chicago White Sox
 John Henry Russell (baseball) (1898–1972), American Negro leagues baseball player
 John Russell (catcher) (born 1961), manager of the Pittsburgh Pirates

Other sports
 John Russell (cricketer) (1883–1965), English cricketer
 Honey Russell (John David Russell, 1902–1973), American basketball player and coach
 John Russell (equestrian) (1920–2020), American Olympic bronze medal-winning equestrian
 John Russell (athlete) (born 1932), Australian long-distance runner
 John A. Russell (born 1933), British Olympic rower
 John Russell (rower) (1935–2019), British Olympic rower
 John Russell (horse trainer) (1936-2004), American horse trainer

Others
 John Russell (pirate) (fl. 1722–1723), possible alias of Portugal's Juan Lopez
 John Russell (collier) (1788–1873), British industrialist and colliery owner
 John Russell (advocate) (died 1613) Scottish lawyer and author
 John Russell (1796–1846), Scottish lawyer and travel writer, brother of James Russell
 John Scott Russell (1808–1882), Scottish naval engineer
 John Russell (developer) (1821–1896), Irish-American industrialist and developer of Ashland, Kentucky
 John Benjamin Russell (1834–1894), New Zealand lawyer, businessman, and landscape gardener
 E. John Russell (1872–1965), British agriculturalist

See also
 Jack Russell (disambiguation)
 Johnny Russell (disambiguation)
 Jonathan Russell (disambiguation)
 Jon Russell (One Life to Live), fictional character in the soap opera
 Jon Russell, a candidate in the United States House of Representatives elections in Washington, 2010